Gilandeh (also Romanized as Gīlāndeh; also known as Khalīfābād, Khalīfehābād, and Khampārū) is a village in Asalem Rural District, Asalem District, Talesh County, Gilan Province, Iran. At the 2006 census, its population was 4,273, in 1,077 families.

References 

Populated places in Talesh County